The 2013 Romanian International Darts Open was the 4th edition of Romanian International Darts Open, organised by the Romanian Darts Federation. The tournament took place 27–29 October 2013 at Hotel Intercontinental in Bucharest. The winner was Tony O'Shea who beat Ron Meulenkamp form Netherlands, in the final, by 6 legs to 2.

The tournament had, as special guests, the English professional darts players, Darryl Fitton (then rank 3 BDO) and Tony O'Shea (then rank 4 BDO).

Men's tournament

Women's tournament

References

External links
 http://rido.federatiedarts.ro/
 Romanian Darts Federation

2013
2013 in Romanian sport
2013 in darts
October 2013 sports events in Romania